Staraya Raychikha is a rural locality (a selo) in Staroraychikhinsky Selsoviet of Bureysky District, Amur Oblast, Russia. The population was 324 as of 2018. There are 7 streets.

Geography 
Staraya Raychikha is located on the right bank of the Raychikha River, 58 km west of Novobureysky (the district's administrative centre) by road. Uspenovka is the nearest rural locality.

References 

Rural localities in Bureysky District